KCRV-FM (105.1 FM) is a radio station licensed to Caruthersville, Missouri, United States.  The station is currently owned by Pollack Broadcasting Co.

History
The station was assigned the call letters KCRV-FM on May 19, 1981. On January 2, 1984 the station changed its call sign to KLOW, on March 21, 2003 to the current KCRV-FM.

References

External links

CRV-FM
Radio stations established in 1981